Dimorphism or dimorphic may refer to:

Science
 Dimorphic root systems, plant roots with two distinctive forms for two separate functions
 Sexual dimorphism, a phenotypic difference between males and females of the same species
 Nuclear dimorphism, when a cell's nuclear apparatus is composed of two structurally and functionally differentiated types of nuclei
 Frond dimorphism, differing forms of fern fronds between the sterile and fertile fronds
 Phenotypic dimorphism, switching between two cell-types
 Dimorphic fungi, fungi which undergo this type of switching
 Dimorphism (geology), the property of some substances to exist in two distinct crystalline forms

Mathematics
 Semilinear map, a homomorphism between modules, paired with the associated homomorphism between the respective base rings

See also
 Polymorphism (disambiguation)
 Monomorphic (disambiguation)